In mathematics, the binary game is a topological game introduced by Stanislaw Ulam in 1935 in an addendum to problem 43 of the Scottish book as a variation of the Banach–Mazur game.

In the binary game, one is given a fixed subset X of the set {0,1}N of all sequences of 0s and 1s. The players take it in turn to choose a digit 0 or 1, and the first player wins if the sequence they form lies in the set X. Another way to represent this game is to pick a subset  of the interval  on the real line, then the players alternatively choose binary digits . Player I wins the game if and only if the binary number , that is, . See, page 237.

The binary game is sometimes called Ulam's game, but "Ulam's game" usually refers to the Rényi–Ulam game.

References

Topological games